Charmaine Cadeau is a Canadian writer, who won the ReLit Award for Poetry in 2015 for her collection Placeholder.

Originally from Toronto, Ontario, Cadeau was educated at the University of New Brunswick and the University of Albany. She is currently an associate professor of English literature at High Point University.

Works
What You Used to Wear (2004)
Placeholder (2013)
"Skytale" (2018)

References

21st-century Canadian poets
Canadian women poets
Canadian expatriate writers in the United States
Writers from Toronto
Living people
University of New Brunswick alumni
University at Albany, SUNY alumni
High Point University people
Year of birth missing (living people)
21st-century Canadian women writers